Neil Amondson (born April 8, 1954) is an American politician who served as a member of the Washington State Senate, representing the 20th district from 1989 to 1995. A member of the Republican Party, he previously served as a member of the Washington House of Representatives from 1987 to 1989.

References

1954 births
Living people
Republican Party members of the Washington House of Representatives
Republican Party Washington (state) state senators